Lemebel is a Chilean documentary film, directed by Joanna Reposi Garibaldi and released in 2019. The film is a portrait of Pedro Lemebel, an influential Chilean poet. It focuses on his artistic activity that started during the military dictatorship, his memories of his mother, and his battle against cancer, which ultimately led to his death in 2015.

The film had its theatrical premiere in February 2019 at the 69th Berlin International Film Festival, where it won the Teddy Award for best LGBTQ-related documentary film.

References

External links
 
 

2019 films
2019 documentary films
2010s Spanish-language films
Chilean documentary films
2019 LGBT-related films
Documentary films about gay men
Documentary films about writers
Chilean LGBT-related films